Edward Ellis may refer to:

Sports
Edward Ellis (cricketer, born 1810) (1810–1887), English cricketer
Edward Ellis (cricketer, born 1995), English cricketer
Ed Ellis (born 1975), American football player
Ted Ellis (footballer) (1913–2007), Australian rules footballer

Others
Edward Ellis, author of Ruth the Betrayer, the first story of a female detective, published in London in 1862
Edward Ellis (actor) (1870–1952), American actor
Edward Ellis (bishop) (1899–1979), Roman Catholic bishop of Nottingham
Edward Ellis (Royal Navy officer) (1918–2002), president of the Royal Naval College, Greenwich
Edward D. Ellis (1801–1848), American newspaper publisher and politician in Michigan
Edward Robb Ellis (1911–1998), American diarist and journalist
Edward S. Ellis (1840–1916), American author
Edward F. W. Ellis (1819–1862), politician, lawyer and American Civil War officer
Ted Ellis (artist) (born 1963), American artist
Ted Ellis (naturalist) (1909–1986), Norfolk naturalist and journalist

See also
Edward Ellice (disambiguation)
Ted Ellis (disambiguation)